Valapady block  is a revenue block of Salem district of the Indian state of Tamil Nadu. This revenue block consists of 20 panchayat villages. They are as follows:
 Athanurpatti
 Kattuveppilaipatti
 Kurichi
 Muthampatti
 Puzhuthikuttai
 Thekkalpatti
 Veppilaipatti
 Chandrapillaivalasu
 Kolathukombai
 Mannaickenpatti
 Neermullikuttai
 Singapuram
 Tirumanur
 Vilaripalayam
 Chinnamanaickenpalayam
 Komarapalayam
 Mannarpalayam
 Ponnarampatti
 Somampatti
 Tukkiyampalayam

References 

Revenue blocks of Salem district